Loader is a surname. Notable people with the surname include:

 Christian Loader (born 1973), Welsh rugby union player
 Clive Loader (born 1953), RAF officer and Leicestershire Police and Crime Commissioner
 Colin Loader (born 1931), New Zealand rugby union player
 Bill Loader (born 1944), Australian theologian
 Brian Loader (born 1958), British scholar and researcher
 Danyon Loader (born 1975), New Zealand swimmer
 Graham Loader, editor of Hob Nob Anyone?
 Jayne Loader (born 1951), American director and writer
 Peter Loader (1929–2011),  English cricketer and umpire